Anet Barrera Esparza (born 9 September 1998) is a Mexican professional racing cyclist, who currently rides for UCI Women's Continental Team . On 30 July 2019 she won the Mexican Road Race Championships in the category Under 23.

Major results
2022
 5th Overall Tour of the Gila
1st  Young rider classification

References

External links
 

1998 births
Living people
Mexican female cyclists
Place of birth missing (living people)
20th-century Mexican women
21st-century Mexican women